Seni District is a district within the Nagqu of the Tibet Autonomous Region, southwest China.

Geography and climate

Located in the northern part of the Tibet Autonomous Region, Seni ranges in latitude from 30° 31' to 31° 55' N and in longitude from 91° 12' to 93° 02' E. Bordering counties within Nagqu are Lhari to the southeast, Biru to the east, Nyainrong to the northeast, Amdo to the northwest, and Baingoin to the west, while Lhasa City, the regional capital, is to the south.

In winter, temperatures frequently drop below  at night and in summer typically rise to  during the day. From June to September, a majority of the days receives some precipitation, and over 80% of the annual precipitation is delivered.

Administrative divisions
The area is made up of several towns and townships:
Nagqu Town
Lhomar Town
Golug Town
Shamong Township
Yöchak Township
Namarche Township
Kormang Township
Taksar Township
Lumé Township
Serzhong Township
Nyima Township
Daqên Township

Transport 
China National Highway 317 runs from Chengdu in Sichuan province to Nagqu County.
Nagqu railway station (Qinghai–Tibet Railway)

References

External links

Counties of Tibet
Nagqu